Mehmed Malkoč (born 10 December 1990) is a Bosnian-Herzegovinian footballer.

Club career
He made his debut in the Austrian Bundesliga with Altach in December 2008; he came on as a late second-half substitute and scored in the 90th minute of the match against Sturm Graz, which Altach lost 3–1. In 2010, he joined Swiss 1. Liga club FC Gossau, where he remained until April 2012.

He spent his final years in the Austrian amateur leagues.

References

1990 births
Living people
Sportspeople from Tuzla
Association football midfielders
Bosnia and Herzegovina footballers
SC Rheindorf Altach players
FC Gossau players
Austrian Football Bundesliga players
Austrian Regionalliga players
Swiss 1. Liga (football) players
Bosnia and Herzegovina expatriate footballers
Expatriate footballers in Austria
Bosnia and Herzegovina expatriate sportspeople in Austria
Expatriate footballers in Switzerland
Bosnia and Herzegovina expatriate sportspeople in Switzerland